A brigade is a military unit.

Brigade may also refer to:
 Brigade (album), a 1990 album by Heart
 Brigade (band), an English rock band
 Brigade (comics), a comic book series by Image Comics
 Brigade (Marvel Comics), a video game character in Marvel Nemesis: Rise of the Imperfects
 Brigade (pejorative), a mild term of collective contempt
 Brigade (Soviet collective farm), a labor-force division
 Brigade de cuisine, the hierarchy of the apprentice system in a professional kitchen
 The Brigade: Race to the Hudson, a 2019 American reality television series
 The Brigade, part of St. John Ambulance Canada
 The Brigade, modified name of the California band Youth Brigade (band), used from 1986 to 1987

Online
 Brigade Media, a former civic technology platform
 Brigading (or swarming), coordinated online harassment subject to Twitter suspensions
 Russian web brigades, teams using sockpuppets to promote pro-Putin and pro-Russian propaganda
 Vote brigading, coordinated online action to manipulate debate, reviews etc.

See also
 Youth Brigade (disambiguation)
 Abdullah Azzam Brigades, Arab Sunni Islamist militant group affiliated with Al-Qaeda and the global jihad movement
 Church Lads' and Church Girls' Brigade, Church of England youth organisation with branches in the United Kingdom and many countries
 International Brigades, military units of foreigners in the Spanish Civil War
 Jewish Brigade, a Jewish Infantry Brigade Group of the British Army that served in Europe during the Second World War 
 Kansas City Brigade, an Arena Football League team
 Baltimore Brigade, an Arena Football League team, unrelated to the aforementioned Kansas City team
 Red Brigades, Marxist–Leninist vanguard paramilitary organization, based in Italy
 Tank Brigade, a 1955 Czechoslovakian film